Epistrenoceras is an extinct genus from a well-known class of fossil cephalopods, the ammonites. It lived during the Bajocian to the Bathonian.

Distribution
Only found only at Winnberg quarry, Sengenthal, Bavaria, Germany.

References

Jurassic ammonites
Fossils of Germany
Ammonitida genera
Perisphinctoidea